A socialist society is a membership organisation that is affiliated with the Labour Party in the UK.

The best-known and oldest socialist society is the Fabian Society, founded in 1884, some years before the creation of the Labour Party itself (in which the Society participated). The Society's membership is relatively small (around 7000) but it exerts much influence in Labour circles. The Co-operative Party is not strictly a "socialist society" in the context of the Labour Party; it is in fact a separate party with an electoral agreement with Labour. It acts as a socialist society for the most part although it has certain additional rights.

Affiliation means that the socialist societies – like a number of British trade unions – pay an affiliation fee to the Labour Party, and the affiliates' members become affiliated supporters of the Labour Party (a different status from full member), unless they specifically choose otherwise. In return the societies receive a formal role in Labour decision-making, and the affiliated supporters can take part in all-member ballots in certain circumstances. For example, they can participate in the election of Labour Party leaders and deputy leaders, have delegates and votes at Annual Conference.

Socialist societies also elect a delegate (currently James Asser) to the Labour National Executive Committee and can affiliate at a local level to Constituency Labour Parties. A second seat was allotted to BAME Labour in early 2007, when its membership rose above 2,500. The Socialist Societies also elect three representatives to the National Policy Forum; currently, these are Sina Lari, Andrew Harrop and Paul Clarkson. Since the 2011 'refounding Labour' process, seats on the NPF have also been allocated to LGBT+ Labour and the Disability Labour.  Each Socialist Society can nominate, and since 2015 Socialist Society members can vote individually, in the Labour leader and deputy leader elections.

The socialist societies are also involved in the Labour Party's policy reviews, and the work of the Socialist Societies is co-ordinated by the Socialist Societies Executive. This is a regular meeting of the chairs and key officers of all the societies to share ideas and co-ordinate work.  These meetings also co-ordinate regular meetings with senior Labour Party officials and MPs.

As a collective, the societies try to co-ordinate campaigning work and hold a joint event at Labour Party conference. A small group of officers are elected to co-ordinate this work. The current committee is:

 Chair – Catherine Atkinson (Society of Labour Lawyers) 
 Vice-chair (Development) – Mike Buckley (Labour Campaign for International Development)
 Vice-chair (Policy) – Hamish Sandison (Labour Business) 
 Secretary – Joe Vinson (LGBT+ Labour)
 Treasurer – Claire Reynolds (Labour Women's Network)

Current socialist societies
As of January 2020, there are 20 affiliated socialist societies:

 Black, Asian Minority Ethnic Labour (BAME Labour) (formerly Labour Party Black Sections and Black Socialist Society)
 Chinese for Labour
 Christians on the Left (formerly The Christian Socialist Movement)
 Disability Labour (formerly Labour Party Disabled Members Group)
 Fabian Society
 Jewish Labour Movement, (formerly Poale Zion)
 Labour Animal Welfare Society
 Labour Business (formerly Labour Finance and Industry Group)
 Labour Campaign for International Development 
 Labour Housing Group
 Labour Movement for Europe
 Labour Party Irish Society
 Labour Women's Network
 LGBT+ Labour
 National Union of Labour and Socialist Clubs
 Scientists for Labour
 Socialist Educational Association
 Socialist Environment and Resources Association (SERA)- Labour's Environmental Campaign
 Socialist Health Association
 Society of Labour Lawyers

There are other organisations, such as Labour Arts Alliance, Muslims for Labour and Labour Humanists, which are not formally affiliated to the Labour Party but act as campaign groups for Labour Party members in the same way as the affiliates, but have yet to apply for affiliation or have decided not to do so.

Young Labour is not a Socialist Society and retains a separate place within the Labour Party.

See also
Labour Party (UK) affiliated trade union
List of organisations associated with the British Labour Party
Socialism

References